Bobby and the Midnites is a 1981 studio album by Grateful Dead singer and guitarist Bob Weir and his then side project, Bobby and the Midnites. The band featured fellow Grateful Dead member Brent Mydland at that time, and also jazz fusion drummer Billy Cobham. Though not a huge commercial success, the album did chart in the Billboard 200 and reached #158 in December 1981.  The song "Festival" became a live concert favorite for the band.  "(I Want to) Fly Away" was reissued on the 2004 compilation album Weir Here – The Best of Bob Weir.

Track listing 
 "Haze" (Brent Mydland, Essra Mohawk, Bob Weir, Bobby Cochran, Matthew Kelly) – 5:08
 "Too Many Losers" (Cochran, Weir) – 3:50
 "Far Away" (Weir, Cochran, Kelly) – 3:34
 "Book of Rules" (Harry Johnson, Barry Llewellyn) – 3:31
 "Me, Without You" (John Perry Barlow, Alphonso Johnson) – 3:12
 "Josephine" (Weir) – 6:11
 "(I Want to) Fly Away" (Barlow, Weir) – 3:55
 "Carry Me" (Weir) – 4:27
 "Festival" (Weir) – 4:59

Personnel

Musicians 
 Billy Cobham – drums, vocals
 Bobby Cochran – guitar, vocals
 Alphonso Johnson – bass guitar, vocals
 Matt Kelly – harmonica, vocals
 Brent Mydland – keyboards, Hammond B3, vocals
 Bob Weir – guitar, vocals

Production 
 Producer – Gary Lyons
 Engineers – Gary Lyons, Gregg Mann, Pete Thea and John Cutler
 Mastering – George Marino
 Lyric supervision – John Barlow
 Art direction – Victor Moscoso
 Photography – Elizabeth Fenimore

References 

1981 albums
Bobby and the Midnites albums
Arista Records albums